Stadium station is a light rail station located in Seattle, Washington. It is situated between the SODO and International District/Chinatown stations on the 1 Line, part of Sound Transit's Link light rail system. The station consists of an at-grade island platform at the intersection of the SODO Busway and South Royal Brougham Way in the SODO neighborhood of Seattle, adjacent to Lumen Field and T-Mobile Park.

Stadium station was proposed in 1998 as part of the segment between the Downtown Seattle and Beacon Hill tunnels and subsequently deferred months later. It was reinstated in 2005 and construction of the station was completed in May 2006, several years before Link light rail service began on July 18, 2009. Trains serve the station twenty hours a day on most days; the headway between trains is six minutes during peak periods, with less frequent service at other times. Stadium station is also served by several Sound Transit Express and King County Metro buses that stop on the SODO Busway west of the platform, as well as the Seattle Greyhound station east of the platform.

Location

Stadium station is situated at the intersection of the SODO Busway and Royal Brougham Way, under the ramps of Interstate 90, in the SODO neighborhood of Seattle. The station is adjacent to a King County Metro employee parking garage, which includes a pedestrian bridge over the platform to the Metro Ryerson Base, and the Seattle Greyhound bus station. The area surrounding Stadium station contains a mixture of light industrial zoning, primarily home to the manufacturing and warehousing industry employing over 13,000 workers, with some retail uses. Lumen Field and T-Mobile Park are located one block west of the station on the north and south sides of Royal Brougham Way, respectively. The light rail line is paralleled to the east by a mixed-use bicycle trail called the SODO Trail, which connects Stadium station to SODO station at South Lander Street. The Seattle Department of Transportation plans to extend the trail further south to Spokane Street, connecting it to a bike trail on the Spokane Street Viaduct, serving West Seattle.

History

Stadium station was not part of the initial Link light rail route approved in 1996, but was created as part of "Route C1" added to Central Link (now the 1 Line) by the Sound Transit Board in 1998. The routing included an at-grade section parallel to the SODO Busway and a tunnel under Beacon Hill, with stations at South Royal Brougham Way, South Lander Street and under Beacon Hill. While "Route C1" was selected as the final Central Link route in 1999, the station at South Royal Brougham Way was deferred, except for the construction of the platform and supports required for an infill station. The Sound Transit Board began studying the re-addition of a station at Royal Brougham Way in late 2004 and approved construction of the newly renamed Stadium station on January 13, 2005, using $3.7 million in surplus funds after bids for the construction of Link Light Rail were lower than budgeted.

Construction of Stadium station began with the laying of the first rails for Central Link, between Holgate and Lander streets, in August 2005. The station itself was built by Kiewit Pacific in less than a year, with opening ceremonies for Stadium and SODO stations held on May 30, 2006, celebrating the completion of the first two Central Link stations. Regular Link service from Seattle to Tukwila began on July 18, 2009, including the use of its pocket track to store extra trains serving a sellout friendly match between the Seattle Sounders and Chelsea at Qwest Field.

Station layout

Stadium station consists of a single , at-grade island platform accessible via an entrance at its north end,  from South Royal Brougham Way. A pocket track located south of the station was built to store extra trains that are deployed after major sporting events.

The station's pictogram is a depiction of the Olympic Torch, a representation of sporting culture. It was created by Christian French as part of the Stellar Connections series and its points represent nearby destinations, including the two stadiums.

Services

Stadium station is part of Sound Transit's 1 Line, which runs from Seattle–Tacoma International Airport through the Rainier Valley, Downtown Seattle, and the University of Washington campus to Northgate. It is the tenth northbound station from Angle Lake and ninth southbound station from Northgate; it is situated between SODO and International District/Chinatown stations. Trains serve Stadium station twenty hours a day on weekdays and Saturdays, from 5:00 am to 1:00 am, and eighteen hours on Sundays, from 6:00 am to 12:00 am; during regular weekday service, trains operate roughly every eight to ten minutes during rush hour and midday operation, respectively, with longer headways of fifteen minutes in the early morning and twenty minutes at night. During weekends, trains arrive at Stadium station every ten minutes during midday hours and every fifteen minutes during mornings and evenings. The station is approximately 29 minutes from SeaTac/Airport station and nine minutes from Westlake station in Downtown Seattle. In 2019, an average of 1,613 passengers boarded Link trains at Stadium station on weekdays.

Stadium station is also served by several bus routes on the SODO Busway, which runs parallel to the 1 Line, at a pair of bus stops west of the station platform at Royal Brougham Way. Three Sound Transit Express routes stop at the station on their way to Tacoma, Lakewood, and Gig Harbor. King County Metro operates two all-day routes through the SODO Busway that serve Renton, Tukwila, and Kent. Metro also runs four peak-direction routes through the SODO Busway towards Renton, Fairwood, Federal Way, and Redondo Heights.

Several "night owl" buses also stop the station and connect with the first southbound light rail departure of the service day. In addition to regular bus service, Metro also runs the Route 97 Link Shuttle, a shuttle service serving Link stations along surface streets during Link service disruptions.

References

External links

Sound Transit Rider Guide

2009 establishments in Washington (state)
Link light rail stations in Seattle
Railway stations in the United States opened in 2009
SoDo, Seattle